Rachiptera baccharidis is a species of tephritid or fruit flies in the genus Rachiptera of the family Tephritidae.

Distribution
Argentina.

References

Tephritinae
Diptera of South America
Insects described in 1868
Taxa named by Camillo Rondani